The politics of Panama take place in a framework of a presidential representative democratic republic with multi-party system, whereby the President of Panama is both head of state and head of government.

Executive power is exercised by the president. Legislative power is vested in the National Assembly. The Judiciary is independent of the executive and the legislature. The branches are according to Panama's Political Constitution of 1972, reformed by the Actos Reformatorios of 1978 and the Acto Constitucional of 1983, united in cooperation and limited through a system of checks and balances.

Three independent organizations with clearly defined responsibilities are found in the constitution: the Comptroller General of the Republic has the responsibility to manage public funds; the Electoral Tribunal has the responsibility to guarantee liberty, transparency, and the efficacy of the popular vote; and the Ministry of the Public oversees interests of State and of the municipalities.

The USAID website ranks Panama at 0.83/1 for democracy, but only 0.5/1 for political corruption.

Executive branch

The Executive Branch includes a president and one vice-president. The president and vice-president are elected on a single ballot for a five-year term by direct popular vote. Presidents are not allowed to immediately run for re-election, but can run again after waiting five years.

State Ministers
 Minister of Agricultural and Livestock Development: Enrique Carles
 Minister of Canal Affairs: Arístides Royo
 Minister of Commerce and Industries: Augusto R. Arosemena Moreno
 Minister of Economy and Finance: Dulcidio de la Gardia
 Minister of Education: Maruja Gorday de Villalobos
 Ministry of Environment: Milciades Concepción
 Minister of Foreign Affairs: Alejandro Ferrer
 Minister of Health: Rosario Turner
 Minister of Housing: Mario Etchelecu
 Minister of Government: María Luisa Romero
 Minister of the Presidency: Álvaro Alemán
 Minister of Public Security: Alexis Bethancourt
 Minister of Public Works: Ramón Arosemena
 Minister of Social Development: Alcibiades Vásquez
 Minister of Work and Labor Development: Luis Ernesto Carles
 Minister of The Woman: Juana Herrera Arauz
 Attorney General: Kenia Isolda Porcell Alvarado
 Manager, National Bank of Panama: Rolando Julio de León Alba
 Permanent Representative to the United Nations, New York: Laura E. Flores H.

(Source: CIA World Factbook: World Leaders, Panama)

Legislative Branch

The legislative branch consists of a unicameral National Assembly (Asamblea Nacional), composed of 71 members elected to five-year terms from single- and multi-seat constituencies.

Judiciary
The Judicial Organ administers justice in a permanent, free and expeditious manner. It comprises the Supreme Court of Justice, the Tribunals, and the judges established by law, according to the constitution of Panama (title VII, chapter 1).

Elections 

An autonomous Electoral Tribunal supervises voter registration, the election process, and the activities of political parties. Everyone over the age of 18 are required to vote, although those who fail to do so are not penalized.

Political Culture

The dominant political parties in Panamanian history have been the PRD and the Panameñista (former Arnulfista Party). These parties were founded by charismatic and strong political enemies, Omar Torrijos (PRD)—the deceased father of the previous president, Martín Torrijos—and Arnulfo Arias (Panameñista/Arnulfista), late husband of the ex-president, Mireya Moscoso. Even though these leaders died years ago, their aura is revived by their followers, and they are present in every election.

Corruption 
Panamanians have been working to root out the after-effects of several decades of military rule since the country's return to democracy in 1989. In 2020, it was reported that Panama loses approximately 1% of its GDP every year to corruption, including government corruption. However, the country is working to improve its democracy, and in July 2020, two ex-presidents of the country (Ricardo Martinelli and Juan Carlos Varela) were questioned over their involvement in the Odebrecht bribery scandal. Martinelli was eventually released after being found not guilty, but was subsequently re-arrested on charges of money laundering. Two sons of Martinelli (Luis Enrique and Ricardo Alberto Martinelli) were also charged with bribery and money laundering by the United States. In August 2020, Panama joined forces with the United States to form a joint task force to root out money laundering.

However, despite the work being done, much still remains to be accomplished, and the International Trade Administration notes that corruption remains the largest hurdle for businesses wanting to invest in the country.

See also 
 Foreign relations of Panama

References

Further reading
 Harding, Robert C. (2001). Military Foundations of Panamanian Politics. Transaction Publishers. .
 Harding, Robert C. (2006). The History of Panama. Greenwood Publishing. .
 Mellander, Gustavo A., Mellander, Nelly, Charles Edward Magoon: The Panama Years. Río Piedras, Puerto Rico: Editorial Plaza Mayor. ISBN 1-56328-155-4. OCLC 42970390. (1999)
 Mellander, Gustavo A., The United States in Panamanian Politics: The Intriguing Formative Years." Danville, Ill.: Interstate Publishers. OCLC 138568. (1971)

External links
National Assembly of Panama
Presidency of Panama
Panama - Government and society | Britannica
Panama: Freedom in the World 2021 Country Report